The 2007 All Golds Tour was a tour by the New Zealand national rugby league team, the Kiwis, of Great Britain and France. Conducted as part of the celebrations of a century of rugby league in New Zealand, it was a re-creation of the original New Zealand rugby league tour of Great Britain in 1907. The Kiwis played four test matches, winning one against France, but losing the series against Great Britain 3–0, failing to win the Baskerville Shield. A special game was played between the "All Golds" and the "Northern Union" which featured many players coming out of international retirement for the game. The tour also involved a reception with the Queen at Buckingham Palace for the squad.

History 

In 1905 New Zealand's rugby union team toured Great Britain and witnessed the growing popularity of the professional Northern Union rugby code. With this popularity in mind, and sensing a financial opportunity, Albert Henry Baskerville recruited a group of players for a professional tour, and wrote to the Northern Rugby Football Union asking if they were willing to host a New Zealand touring party. This team toured Australia and then Great Britain in 1907, and was known colloquially as the All Golds, or Professional All Blacks.

Squad 

 Coach: Gary Kemble
*Also played in All Golds match.

Australian representative 
To celebrate the inclusion of Australia's Dally Messenger in the original All Golds tour, New Zealand Warriors captain and Queensland front rower Steve Price was invited to join the New Zealand team for the match against the Northern Union. The Australian test prop said it was "mind-blowing" to be invited on the tour.

Andrew Johns had initially been invited, but due to a career-ending neck injury, he was unable to play with the squad. Australian captain Darren Lockyer was then set to take Johns' place until he too was ruled out after suffering a season-ending knee injury. Trent Barrett was also linked with the stand-off role in the side.

All Blacks and former Kiwi Test players 
The NZRL expressed interest in including recently retired New Zealand rugby league stars Nigel Vagana, Ruben Wiki, and Stacey Jones in test matches. All three came out of international retirement to play in the match against the Northern Union.

Several current and former All Blacks (New Zealand rugby union players) were also considered for the match against the Northern Union. Players who grew up playing rugby league such as Carlos Spencer, Piri Weepu and Ma'a Nonu were approached by the NZRL however none were available due to rugby union commitments. Jonah Lomu was also considered but was effectively ruled out due to media and personal appearance commitments at the 2007 Rugby World Cup.

Coach 
Brisbane Broncos' Australian coach Wayne Bennett accepted the invitation from the New Zealand Rugby League to join the All Golds for their commemorative match against the Northern Union in England in October. The former Queensland and Australia coach stated "This is a great honour and it's unique in the game."

New Zealand vs Australia 
There was a pre-tour test between Australia and New Zealand in Wellington.

All Golds v Northern Union 
This was an exhibition match played under 1907 scoring rules with tries worth 3 points and goals / field goals worth 2 points each.

Fixtures 
The New Zealand side played a total of five matches while on their European tour and one test in New Zealand before leaving.

Baskerville Shield

Venues 
The three Baskerville Shield tests took place at the following venues.

1st Test

2nd Test

3rd Test

France vs New Zealand

Aftermath 
Great Britain's scrum half back, Rob Burrow was awarded the George Smith Medal as player of the series which he finished as top points scorer with 26 from two tries and nine goals.
Coach Gary Kemble was fired after the tour losses, with Roy Asotasi and David Kidwell leading a public campaign to replace him. Kemble was replaced by Stephen Kearney as head coach and Wayne Bennett assistant coach, a combination which took the Kiwis to win the 2008 World Cup. The All Golds played another match, against the New Zealand Māori in New Plymouth, in 2008 as part of the lead up to the Rugby League World Cup.

See also 
 New Zealand Rugby League
 Rugby league in New Zealand

References

External links 
 "NZ League To Take Hard Line With NRL", xtraMSN website, retrieved 27 July 2006.
 "States the wish for Wiki, Vagana and Jones to play in the Tour, retrieved 20 May 2007

New Zealand national rugby league team tours
Rugby league tours of France
Rugby league tours of Great Britain
All Golds Tour
All Golds Tour
All Golds Tour
All Golds Tour